The 1957 Cal Poly Mustangs football team represented California Polytechnic State College—now known as California Polytechnic State University, San Luis Obispo—as a member of the California Collegiate Athletic Association (CCAA) during the 1957 NCAA College Division football season. Led by eighth-year head coach LeRoy Hughes, Cal Poly compiled an overall record of 8–1 with a mark of 3–0 in conference play, placing first in the CCAA, although no conference champion was recognized. The team outscored its opponents 210 to 108 for the season. The Mustangs played home games at Mustang Stadium in San Luis Obispo, California.

Schedule

Team players in the NFL
The following were selected in the 1958 NFL Draft.

Notes

References

Cal Poly
Cal Poly Mustangs football seasons
Cal Poly Mustangs football